Cangas Left Alternative (Alternativa Canguesa de Esquerda in Galician language; ACE) is a coalition of 3 political parties and various independents in the municipality of Cangas, Pontevedra.

History
In the municipal elections of May 27, 2007 ACE gained 1,890 votes, the 13.1% of the total vote, and three councilors out of a total of 21. ACE supported and participated in a government of the Galician Nationalist Bloc (BNG) and the Socialists' Party of Galicia (PSdG). On January 28, 2010 ACE broke the agreement (in a decision that was taken in an open assembly) due to the supposed attacks of the BNG against the elected representatives of ACE. ACE supported a local social movement called A Ría Non se Vende (The ría is not for sale) against the plans of the local government to build a new port in an area with historic and natural values. 49 neighbors of Cangas were judged due to the incidents during the demonstrations against the new port, including various members of ACE.

In 2011 ACE reached 1,744 votes, which accounted for the 12.77% of the vote, keeping the 3 Councillors. In the local elections of 2015 ACE gained 4 town councillors (2 of the Galician People's Front and two of the United Left) and, for the first time, the mayorship of the municipality thanks to a pact with the BNG and Assembly for Unity (ASpUN).

Election results

See also
 SON

References

References

External links
Official website
Official Twitter

2007 establishments in Spain
Communist parties in Spain
Galician nationalist parties
Left-wing nationalist parties
Left-wing political party alliances
Political parties established in 2007
Political parties in Galicia (Spain)
Political party alliances in Spain
Socialist parties in Galicia (Spain)